It's... Madness is a compilation album by the British pop band Madness released in 1990. It combines some of the band's hit singles and b-sides. A sequel to this, It's... Madness Too, was released the next year.

Track listing
"House of Fun"
"Don't Look Back"
"Wings of a Dove"
"The Young and the Old"
"My Girl"
"Stepping into Line"
"Baggy Trousers"
"The Business"
"Embarrassment"
"One's Second Thoughtlessness"
"Grey Day"
"Memories"
"It Must Be Love"
"Deceives the Eye"
"Driving in My Car"
"Animal Farm"

Certifications and sales

References

External links

1990 compilation albums
Madness (band) compilation albums
Virgin Records compilation albums